The Biała Voivodeship was a voivodeship (province) of the Polish People's Republic from 1975 to 1989, and the Third Republic of Poland from 1989 to 1998. Its capital was Bielsko-Biała. It was established on 1 June 1975, from the parts of the voivodeships of Katowice, and Kraków, and existed until 31 December 1998, when it was partitioned between then-established Lesser Poland, and Silesian Voivodeships.

History 
The Biała Voivodeship was established on 1 June 1975, as part of the administrative reform, and was one of the voivodeships (provinces) of the Polish People's Republic. It was formed from the part of the territories of the voivodeships of Katowice, and Kraków. Its capital was located in the city of Bielsko-Biała. In 1975, it had a population of 779 300 people.

On 9 December 1989, the Polish People's Republic was replaced by the Third Republic of Poland. In 1997, the voivodeship had a population of 924 000 people, and had an area of 3 704 km². It existed until 31 December 1998, when it was partitioned between then-established Lesser Poland, and Silesian Voivodeships.

Subdivisions 

In 1997, the voivodeship was divided into 59 gminas (municipalities), including 8 urban municipalities, 10 urban-rural municipalities, and 18 rural municipalities. It had 18 cities and towns.

From 1990 to 1998, it was additionally divided into five district offices, each comprising several municipalities.

Demographics

Leaders 
The leader of the administrative division was the voivode. Those were:
 1 June 1975 – February 1981: Józef Łabudek;
 10 March 1981 – 7 November 1987: Stanisław Łuczkiewicz;
 18 December 1987 – 2 April 1990: Franciszek Strzałka;
 9 April 1990 – 1 February 1994: Mirosław Styczeń;
24 February 1994 – 28 November 1997: Marek Trombski;
 9 December 1997 – 31 December 1998: Andrzej Sikora.

Citations

Notes

References 

Former voivodeships of Poland (1975–1998)
History of Lesser Poland Voivodeship
History of Silesian Voivodeship
Bielsko-Biała
States and territories established in 1975
States and territories disestablished in 1998
1975 establishments in Poland
1998 disestablishments in Poland